The 2017–18 Arkansas–Pine Bluff Golden Lions men's basketball team represented the University of Arkansas at Pine Bluff during the 2017–18 NCAA Division I men's basketball season. The Golden Lions, led by 10th-year head coach George Ivory, played their home games at the K. L. Johnson Complex as members of the Southwestern Athletic Conference. They finished the season 14–21, 12–6 in SWAC play to finish in a three-way tie for second place. Due to Grambling State's Academic Progress Rate violations and subsequent postseason ineligibility, the Golden Lions received the No. 1 seed in the SWAC tournament. They defeated Mississippi Valley State and Southern before losing to Texas Southern in the tournament championship.

Previous season
The Golden Lions finished the 2016–17 season 7–25, 6–12 in SWAC play to finish in a tie for eighth place. They did not qualify for the SWAC tournament.

Roster

Schedule and results

|-
!colspan=9 style=|Non-conference regular season

|-
!colspan=9 style=| SWAC regular season

|-
!colspan=9 style="background:#000000; color:#FFD700;"| SWAC tournament

References

Arkansas–Pine Bluff Golden Lions men's basketball seasons
Arkansas-Pine Bluff
Gold
Gold